Labeo pangusia is a species of fish in the genus Labeo. It occurs in mountain streams, lakes, river and ponds in northern India, Bangladesh, Pakistan, Bhutan and Nepal. Its populations are declining, the main cause seems to be the damming of the waters it lives in so that explosives can be set to catch other fish. This species is of minor importance for human consumption.

References 

Labeo
Fish of Bangladesh
Fish described in 1822